The impossible cube or irrational cube is an impossible object invented by M.C. Escher for his print Belvedere. It is a two-dimensional figure that superficially resembles a perspective drawing of a three-dimensional cube, with its features drawn inconsistently from the way they would appear in an actual cube.

Usage in art
In Escher's Belvedere a boy seated at the foot of a building holds an impossible cube. A drawing of the related Necker cube (with its crossings circled) lies at his feet, while the building itself shares some of the same impossible features as the cube.

Other artists than Escher, including Jos De Mey, have also made artworks featuring the impossible cube.
A doctored photograph purporting to be of an impossible cube was published in the June 1966 issue of Scientific American, where it was called a "Freemish crate". An impossible cube has also been featured on an Austrian postage stamp.

Explanation

The impossible cube draws upon the ambiguity present in a Necker cube illustration, in which a cube is drawn with its edges as line segments, and can be interpreted as being in either of two different three-dimensional orientations.

An impossible cube is usually rendered as a Necker cube in which the line segments representing the edges have been replaced by what are apparently solid beams.
In Escher's print, the top four joints of the cube, and the upper of the two crossings between its beams, match one of the two interpretations of the Necker cube, while the bottom four joints and the bottom crossing match the other interpretation. Other variations of the impossible cube combine these features in different ways; for instance, the one shown in Escher's painting draws all eight joints according to one interpretation of the Necker cube and both crossings according to the other interpretation.

The apparent solidity of the beams gives the impossible cube greater visual ambiguity than the Necker cube, which is less likely to be perceived as an impossible object. The illusion plays on the human eye's interpretation of two-dimensional pictures as three-dimensional objects. It is possible for three-dimensional objects to have the visual appearance of the impossible cube when seen from certain angles, either by making carefully placed cuts in the supposedly solid beams or by using forced perspective, but human experience with right-angled objects makes the impossible appearance seem more likely than the reality.

See also 
 Penrose triangle
 Blivet

References

Optical illusions
Impossible objects
Cubes
M. C. Escher